QR may refer to:

Arts and entertainment

 Nippon Cultural Broadcasting (from call sign JOQR), a Tokyo radio station
 Queen's Radio, a student radio station at Queen's University Belfast
 Quiet Riot, an American rock band

Businesses
 Qatar Airways (IATA code)
 Queensland Rail, a company responsible for the railway system in Queensland, Australia
 Quintana Roo (company), a triathlon-specific wetsuit and bicycle company

Places
 Quintana Roo, a state of Mexico
 Karakalpakstan (Qoraqalpog'iston Respublikasi), Uzbekistan (ISO 3166-2 subcode UZ-QR)

Science and technology
 QR code (Quick Response code), a two-dimensional code
 ATCvet code QR Respiratory system, a section of the Anatomical Therapeutic Chemical Classification System for veterinary medicinal products
 DICOM Q/R, DICOM Query / Retrieve
 Nissan QR engine

Mathematics
 QR decomposition, a decomposition of a matrix
 QR algorithm, an eigenvalue algorithm using QR decomposition
 Quadratic reciprocity, a theorem from modular arithmetic
 Quasireversibility, a property of some queues
 Reaction quotient (Qr), a function of the activities or concentrations of the chemical species involved in a chemical reaction

Other uses
 Quarterly Review, a defunct literary and political periodical
 Qatari riyal, the currency of Qatar